Upton is a town in Weston County, Wyoming, United States. The population was 898 at the 2020 census. The slogan of the town is: "The best town on earth".

Geography
Upton is located at  (44.103354, –104.625943).

Upton is home to an abundance of wildlife. Nearby are lakes and streams with many fish species.

Climate

Demographics

2010 census
As of the 2010 United States Census of 2010, there were 1,100 people, 467 households, and 303 families residing in the town. The racial makeup of the town was 95.6% White, 0.2% African American, 1.7% Native American, 0.5% Asian, 0.7% from other races, and 1.3% from two or more races. Hispanic or Latino of any race were 2.3% of the population.

There were 467 households, of which 29.3% had children under the age of 18 living with them, 52.2% were married couples living together, 5.4% had a female householder with no husband present, 7.3% had a male householder with no wife present, and 35.1% were non-families. 28.7% of all households were made up of individuals, and 12.2% had someone living alone who was 65 years of age or older. The average household size was 2.36 and the average family size was 2.88.

The median age in the town was 38.4 years. 25.5% of residents were under the age of 18; 8.7% were between the ages of 18 and 24; 23.1% were from 25 to 44; 25.6% were from 45 to 64; and 17.1% were 65 years of age or older. The gender makeup of the town was 50.5% male and 49.5% female.

2000 census
As of the 2000 United States Census of 2000, there were 872 people, 359 households, and 255 families residing in the town. The population density was 663.8 people per square mile (257.0/km2). There were 441 housing units at an average density of 335.7 per square mile (130.0/km2). The racial makeup of the town was 95.99% White, 0.69% Native American, 0.34% Asian, 0.34% from other races, and 2.64% from two or more races. Hispanic or Latino of any race were 1.83% of the population.

There were 359 households, out of which 32.3% had children under the age of 18 living with them, 64.6% were married couples living together, 3.9% had a female householder with no husband present, and 28.7% were non-families. 25.9% of all households were made up of individuals, and 15.0% had someone living alone who was 65 years of age or older. The average household size was 2.43 and the average family size was 2.93.

In the town, the population was spread out, with 26.4% under the age of 18, 7.2% from 18 to 24, 24.2% from 25 to 44, 24.7% from 45 to 64, and 17.5% who were 65 years of age or older. The median age was 41 years. For every 100 females, there were 94.6 males. For every 100 females age 18 and over, there were 94.0 males.

The median income for a household in the town was $31,053, and the median income for a family was $39,091. Males had a median income of $40,208 versus $17,500 for females. The per capita income for the town was $15,165. About 6.7% of families and 11.1% of the population were below the poverty line, including 10.2% of those under age 18 and 14.4% of those age 65 or over.

Education
Public education in the town of Upton is provided by Weston County School District #7. Schools serving the town include Upton Elementary School (grades K–5), Upton Middle School (grades 6–8), and Upton High School (grades 9–12).

Upton has a public library, a branch of the Weston County Library System.

Attractions
Upton is home to The Red Onion Museum, which features work from local artist Dave Paulley. The Weston County Gazette, the town's local newspaper, has been operating in Upton for nearly a century. Old Town offers a glimpse of pioneer times with buildings relocated from the original townsite.

See also
 List of towns in Wyoming

References

External links

Towns in Weston County, Wyoming
Towns in Wyoming